Claude Bigot de Sainte-Croix (3 May 1744, Paris – 25 August 1803, London) was French Foreign Minister.

Brilliant conversationalist and diplomat, appointed Foreign Minister, he fulfilled his duties for ten days, during which he barely had time to show his courage and loyalty to the king, especially the day of 10 August 1792. He fled to London, and died in exile.

1744 births
1803 deaths
French Foreign Ministers